The Municipal Borough of Richmond or Richmond Municipal Borough was a municipal borough in Surrey, England from 1890 to 1965.

History
 
The borough was created in 1890 under a Royal Charter, covering the civil (and also the ecclesiastical) parish of Richmond St Mary Magdalene.  This soon expanded with consent from Surrey County Council in 1892 to cover the parishes of Kew, Petersham and most of Mortlake. John Whittaker Ellis was its first mayor, and he purchased and provided the site in Richmond for a town hall; the street in which it is located is named Whittaker Avenue after him.

Under the Local Government Act 1894, the Mortlake civil parish was split, with the majority covering  outside the borough becoming the west of the Barnes Urban District and the rest remaining and forming a new North Sheen civil parish.

In 1933 the borough was the main recipient of the land and main settlement in the defunct Ham Urban District, which had been an urban district since 1894.

The borough was abolished in 1965 when it was replaced by the larger London Borough of Richmond upon Thames, and Surrey County Council was replaced here by Greater London local government institutions, at which time the ceremonial county also changed.

Notable former councillors and aldermen
 John Whittaker Ellis
 James Szlumper

Coat of arms 
The coat of arms of the borough was granted on 19 June 1891. The arms is per fess gules and azure on a fess ermine between in chief a lion passant guardant between two portcullises or and in base a swan argent upon water proper; a representation of the ancient Palace of Richmond proper between two roses gules barbed and seeded proper.

The crest was a stag regardant proper, holding in its mouth two roses on one stem, one argent, the other gules, and supporting with the dexter fore hoof a shield or a wreath vert.

The portcullises, roses and lion were all associated with King Henry VII, who brought the rival houses of Lancaster and York together and helped build the palace. The swan represented the River Thames. The stag represented Richmond Park and Old Deer Park, and the wreath the idea of municipality.

Today the arms may still be seen in five places in Richmond: on The Richmond Arms'  pub sign in Princes Street; in the façade of the former post office in George Street; in the façade of the Old Town Hall in Whittaker Avenue, next to the clock above the entrance; on the Richmond War Memorial, which is near the Old Town Hall; and above the proscenium arch in the Richmond Theatre. There is also an example on display at the Museum of Richmond.

See also
 Old Town Hall, Richmond
 Museum of Richmond

References

External links

 Survey of medical archives in London, including Richmond, from the Wellcome Library

1890 establishments in England
Districts abolished by the London Government Act 1963
Ham, London
History of the London Borough of Richmond upon Thames
Kew, London
Mortlake, London
Municipal boroughs of England
Petersham, London
Municipal Borough